The Hajji Ahmed the Ducat Minter's Mosque is one of the most easily recognizable architectural symbols of Livno, Bosnia and Herzegovina.

Mosque complex
Mosque complex Glavica (in the picture on the left) with the Hajji Ahmed the Ducat Minter's Mosque (more commonly known as the Glavica ("Head") Mosque, called after the knap above town on which is erected) is one of the most recognizable architectural symbols of Livno and national monument of Bosnia and Herzegovina. Built in 1574 (some date to 1587), it is situated on a hill overlooking old town of livno, the river Bistrica and the spring Duman in the upper section of the old town of Livno. The mosque complex consists of compact main building of the mosque under a dome and uncharacteristically short minaret, with a clock tower which was erected some 100 years later, between 1670 and 1680. but more likely in 1659. It is still in function today, and finally within perimeter is almost 500 years old necropolis with characteristic early Bosnian Muslim tombstones and later ones.

On 25 April 2022, the mosque hosted an iftar (breaking of the Ramadan fast) attended by Turkish Parliament Speaker Mustafa Şentop during his two-day official visit to Bosnia and Herzegovina.

See also
 Livanjsko Polje

References

Religious buildings and structures completed in 1562
16th-century mosques
Buildings and structures in the Federation of Bosnia and Herzegovina
Ottoman mosques in Bosnia and Herzegovina
1562 establishments in the Ottoman Empire
History of Livno